Hong Kong Guide is a Hong Kong atlas published by the Survey and Mapping Office (SMO), Lands Department of Hong Kong Government. From 2005, Hong Kong Guide 2005 includes photomaps in parallel to traditional maps.

References

Mass media in Hong Kong
Tourism in Hong Kong